The 2000 UNLV Rebels football team represented the University of Nevada, Las Vegas during the 2000 NCAA Division I-A football season. UNLV competed as a member of the Mountain West Conference (MW) and played their home games at Sam Boyd Stadium in Whitney, Nevada.

Schedule

References

UNLV
UNLV Rebels football seasons
Las Vegas Bowl champion seasons
UNLV Rebels football